Elio de Angelis (26 March 1958 – 15 May 1986) was an Italian racing driver who participated in Formula One between  and , racing for the Shadow, Lotus and Brabham teams. He was killed in an accident while testing the Brabham BT55 at the Paul Ricard circuit, near the commune of Le Castellet, France, in 1986. De Angelis was a very competitive and highly popular presence in Formula One during the 1980s, and is sometimes referred to as Formula One's "last gentleman player".

Early life
De Angelis was born in Rome. His father Giulio was an inshore and offshore powerboat racer who won many world championships in the 1960s and 1970s.

After a brief spell with karts, de Angelis went on to win the Italian Formula Three Championship in 1977. In 1978 he raced in Formula Two for Minardi and then for the ICI British F2 Team, he also competed in one round of the British Formula One championship and won the prestigious Monaco F3 race.

Formula One
At the end of the 1977 season, de Angelis was on Enzo Ferrari's short list to replace Niki Lauda. De Angelis successfully tested the Ferrari at the Fiorano circuit but eventually Ferrari decided to hire Gilles Villeneuve. He finished seventh in his maiden Grand Prix in Argentina and 15th in the championship with three points.

At the age of 21, de Angelis became the youngest Grand Prix podium finisher of all time when he finished  second at the Brazilian Grand Prix, run at the  Interlagos circuit.

His first victory came in the 1982 Austrian Grand Prix at the Österreichring,  0.05 seconds ahead of the Williams of eventual  World Champion Keke Rosberg. The win was the last hailed by Colin Chapman's  act of throwing his cloth cap into the air. Chapman died in December that year and Peter Warr became the new Lotus team manager.

In  Lotus switched from the Cosworth DFV they had been using since , to Renault turbo engines, but it was a disappointing season, suffering multiple mechanical failures. De Angelis's best result was a fifth place in the 1983 Italian Grand Prix.

In  de Angelis had a much better season, scoring a total of 34 points and finishing third in the standings with three podiums. His best result was a second place at the Detroit Grand Prix. De Angelis was the only driver to finish in the top 5 in 1984 not to score a race win, showing his consistent performances throughout the season with the improving Lotus-Renault.

In , de Angelis was joined at Lotus by Ayrton Senna, who had left the Toleman team. De Angelis's second win came in the third race of the season, at the 1985 San Marino Grand Prix, after Alain Prost was disqualified when his McLaren MP4/2B was found 2 kg underweight. De Angelis also claimed his last Formula One pole position that year in Canada. He finished fifth in the championship, with 33 points, five points behind his teammate. However, de Angelis chose to leave Lotus at the end of the season, frustrated that the team's efforts were being focused mostly on Senna.

Fellow Italian Riccardo Patrese was his teammate. Patrese was returning to the Bernie Ecclestone owned team after two unhappy years with Alfa Romeo.

The 1986 Brabham-BMW, the BT55, was the brainchild of long time Brabham designer Gordon Murray. The BT55 was a lowline car with a reduced frontal area, the idea being to have a cleaner airflow over the car to create more downforce, while at the same time reducing the car's drag. The chassis proved effective, unlike the l4 BMW turbo that had to be tilted to an angle of 72°. This caused severe oil surge and an even greater lack of throttle response than the BMW had become famous for. Although the team worked hard to overcome these problems, it was clear from early in the season that Brabham had fallen behind the leading pack.

Death and aftermath
In May 1986, during tests at the Paul Ricard circuit in France, the rear wing of de Angelis's BT55 detached at high speed resulting in the car losing downforce on the rear wheels, which instigated a cartwheel over a crash barrier, causing the car to catch fire. The impact itself did not kill de Angelis but he was unable to extract himself from the car unassisted. The situation was exacerbated by the lack of track marshals on the circuit who could have provided him with emergency assistance. A 30-minute delay ensued before a helicopter arrived and de Angelis died 29 hours later, at the hospital in Marseille where he had been taken, from smoke inhalation. His actual crash impact injuries were only a broken collar bone and light burns on his back. 

De Angelis's death also saw the end of Formula One using the full 5.81 km (3.61 mi) Paul Ricard Circuit. F1 cars started using the 3.812 km (2.369 mi) "Club" version of the circuit, bypassing the Verriere curves where the Brabham had crashed, and cutting the length of the Mistral Straight from 1.8 to 1 km in length. The move was unpopular with many of the drivers, although most did like the reduced straight length as it was easier on the engines. Paul Ricard would not host a race on the full layout until , which featured sharper Verriere curves and a chicane on Mistral effectively cutting the straight to two 800m straights.

De Angelis's place in the Brabham team was subsequently taken by Derek Warwick, allegedly because Warwick was the only available top level driver who did not contact team owner Bernie Ecclestone immediately after de Angelis's death asking to replace him. McLaren driver Keke Rosberg, who was a close friend of de Angelis, retired at the end of the 1986 season.

De Angelis was the last driver to die in a Formula One car until Roland Ratzenberger died during qualifying for the San Marino Grand Prix at Imola eight years later.

Legacy
De Angelis was a concert-standard pianist, and famously kept his fellow Formula One drivers entertained with his skills by playing multiple concertos by Chopin and Mozart, while they locked themselves in a Johannesburg hotel before the 1982 South African Grand Prix at Kyalami when the Grand Prix Drivers Association held a strike in protest at the new Super Licence conditions imposed by the governing body, the  FIA.

In 2017 de Angelis was honoured at the Ludovico Scarfiotti Memorial in Rome.

Racing record

Career summary

Formula One World Championship results
(key) (Races in bold indicate pole position)

 ‡ Race was stopped with less than 75% of laps completed, half points awarded.

References

External links
 Elio de Angelis Tribute Page
 Unfinished Symphony: An Elio de Angelis Tribute
 Elio de Angelis at Motorsport Memorial

1958 births
1986 deaths
Italian racing drivers
Italian Formula One drivers
Shadow Formula One drivers
Team Lotus Formula One drivers
Brabham Formula One drivers
Formula One race winners
European Formula Two Championship drivers
FIA European Formula 3 Championship drivers
Italian Formula Three Championship drivers
British Formula One Championship drivers
Racing drivers who died while racing
Deaths by smoke inhalation
Italian pianists
Racing drivers from Rome
Sport deaths in France
20th-century pianists
20th-century Italian musicians
Karting World Championship drivers